The white-eared pocket mouse (Perognathus alticola) is a species of rodent in the family Heteromyidae. It is endemic to the San Bernardino Mountains and the Tehachapi Mountains of southern California in the United States.  There are two subspecies of P. alticola in California, P. a. alticola and P. a. inexpectatus, both of which are considered species of special concern by the California Department of Fish and Wildlife.

Characteristics 
White-eared pocket mice are native to the San Bernardino Mountains and Tehachapi Mountains in California. They are named after there feature of having white or yellowish hair on the external portion of there ear. Within the genus Perognathus, P. alticola is on the medium to large size. The back of the mouse is yellowish brown with blackish lines and the underbelly of it is white. The tail typically has two or three colors. The under portion is white and the top portion matches the back of the mouse with the tip of the tail being black or dusky in color. The body length, tail length, hind foot length and length of many other feature of the male is much larger than the female. This means they are sexually dimorphic based on size.

Anatomy

Sexually dimorphic measurements

Distribution 
White-eared pocket mice are only found in California. They can be found in Kern county, Los Angeles county, San Bernardino County and the San Bernardino Mountains.

Ecology 
Perognathus alticola can be found in Ponderosa pine forest and open pine forest with bracken ferns Pteridium aquilinum, in wooded habitats that contain Joshua tree and pinyon-juniper woodland, and in grasslands with scattered Ponderosa pine. They can also be found in chaparral , coastal-sage, and areas with an abundance of Salsola .

References

Perognathus
Endemic fauna of California
Fauna of the Western United States
Fauna of the California chaparral and woodlands
San Bernardino Mountains
Endangered fauna of California
Mammals described in 1894
Taxonomy articles created by Polbot